Chips Act may refer to:

 CHIPS and Science Act, legislation in the United States enacted in 2022
 European Chips Act, proposed legislation in the European Union